Myrl Lincoln Brown (October 10, 1894 – February 23, 1981) was a Major League Baseball pitcher who played with the Pittsburgh Pirates in .

During the 1920 season, the Pirates bought Brown's contract from the Reading Aces of the International League for $20,000. This was the highest price ever paid for an International League player up to that point.

References

External links

1894 births
1981 deaths
Lebanon Valley Flying Dutchmen baseball players
Major League Baseball pitchers
Baseball players from Pennsylvania
Pittsburgh Pirates players
People from Waynesboro, Pennsylvania
Newark Bears (IL) players
Reading Aces players
Reading Coal Barons players
Reading Marines players
Springfield Ponies players